Siphoneugena is a genus of the botanical family Myrtaceae, first described as a genus in 1856. It is native to Central and South America as well as the West Indies.

Species

References

 
Myrtaceae genera
Neotropical realm flora